Pete Sampras was the defending champion, but chose not to participate that year.

Andre Agassi won in the final 6–2, 6–3, against Sébastien Grosjean.

Players

Draw

Main draw

Play-offs

External links
Official Commonwealth Bank International website
2003 Commonwealth Bank International results

Kooyong Classic
Com